The men's 400 metre freestyle event at the 11th FINA World Swimming Championships (25m) took place 14 December 2012 at the Sinan Erdem Dome.

In June 2013, Danish swimmer Mads Glæsner was stripped of the bronze medal after testing positive for levomethamphetamine.

Records
Prior to this competition, the existing world and championship records were as follows.

No new records were set during this competition.

Results

Heats

Final

The final was held at 19:55.

References

External links
 2012 FINA World Swimming Championships (25 m): Men's 400 metre freestyle entry list, from OmegaTiming.com.

Freestyle 0400 metre, men's
World Short Course Swimming Championships